C10, C.X or C-10 may refer to:

Commercial products
 GMC C-10 or Chevrolet C-10, a pickup truck
 JNR Class C10, a class of Japanese steam locomotive
 C10, a model of Nissan Skyline (1968–1972)
 C10, an international standard paper size (28×40 mm), defined in ISO 216

Military
 Albatros C.X, a World War I German military reconnaissance aircraft
 C-X, USAF next generation airlifter program to replace both the C-130 and C-17
 Fokker C.X, a 1933 Dutch biplane scout and light bomber
 Handley Page Jetstream aircraft designated C-10A by the United States military
 HMS C10, a United Kingdom Royal Navy submarine which saw service during World War I
 KC-10 Extender, an aerial refueler used by the United States Air Force
 Kawasaki C-X, a 2007 Japanese transport aircraft 
 USS Detroit (C-10), a United States Navy cruiser which operated in the Caribbean prior to World War I
 XC-10 Robin, used by the United States Army Air Corps to test radio-controlled flight

Science and technology
 Champernowne constant, a real yet irrational, non-algebraic, and transcendental number
 ATC code C10 (Lipid modifying agents), a subgroup of the Anatomical Therapeutic Chemical Classification System
 Chromosome 10, one of the 23 pairs of human chromosomes
 Caldwell 10 (NGC 663), an open cluster in Cassiopeia
 Carbon-10 (C-10 or 10C), an isotope of carbon
 LNER Class C10, a temporary classification for saturated C11s while superheating was underway

Other uses
 French Defence, Encyclopaedia of Chess openings code
 C10 Minimum Age (Agriculture) Convention, 1921
 Vlakplaas, also called Unit C-10, a section of the South African Police responsible for assassinating opponents of Apartheid during the 1980s
 Bill C-10 (disambiguation), the official numbering for several Canadian bills
 Committee of Ten, US Education Committee

See also
 10C (disambiguation)